The Elbert W. Holt House is a historic house at 902 North Main Street in Nashville, Arkansas, U.S. It is a 1½ story wood-frame structure, roughly rectangular in shape, with a hip roof and five projecting gable sections. Although it is predominantly Colonial Revival in its styling, its massing and busy exterior are reminiscent of the Queen Anne period. The house was built in 1910 by Elbert Holt, a local builder of some reputation (probably best known for building the Howard County Courthouse), to be his own home. Both the exterior and interior have received only modest alteration since the house's construction.

The house was listed on the National Register of Historic Places in 1984.

See also
Flavius Holt House, the home of Holt's uncle, located nearby on Kohler Street
National Register of Historic Places listings in Howard County, Arkansas

References

Houses on the National Register of Historic Places in Arkansas
Colonial Revival architecture in Arkansas
Houses completed in 1910
Houses in Howard County, Arkansas
National Register of Historic Places in Howard County, Arkansas
Queen Anne architecture in Arkansas
1910 establishments in Arkansas